The third Connecticut House of Representatives district elects one member of the Connecticut House of Representatives. Its current representative is Minnie Gonzalez. The district consists of part of the city of Hartford, including the neighborhoods of Parkville and Frog Hollow. The district is one of few in Connecticut to have a Hispanic majority population. Owing to this fact, it is one of the safest House districts in Connecticut for Democrats; a Republican candidate has not run in the district in over a decade.

List of representatives

Recent elections

External links 
 Google Maps - Connecticut House Districts

References

03
Hartford, Connecticut